Archibald or Archie Robertson may refer to:

Sports
Archie Robertson (footballer) (1929–1978), Scottish footballer
Archie Robertson (shinty player) (born 1950), ex-shinty player

Others
Archibald Robertson (painter) (1765–1835), Scottish born painter who operated the Columbian Academy of Painting in New York with his brother Alexander
Archibald Robertson (physician) (1789–1864), Scottish physician; grandfather of the bishop
Archibald Robertson (bishop) (1853–1931), Principal of King's College London and Bishop of Exeter
Archibald Thomas Robertson (1863–1934), American theologian
Archibald Robertson (atheist) (1886–1961), British atheist, son of the bishop
Archie Robertson (trade unionist) (1886–1961), English trade unionist
Rev. A. E. Robertson (1870–1958), first person to "bag" Scotlands 283 peaks

See also
 Robertson (surname)